The IEEE Transactions on Image Processing is a monthly peer-reviewed scientific journal covering aspects of image processing in the field of signal processing. It was established in 1992 and is published by the IEEE Signal Processing Society. The editor-in-chief is Alessandro Foi (Tampere University). According to the Journal Citation Reports, the journal has a 2020 impact factor of 10.856.

References

External links

Image processing
IEEE academic journals
Monthly journals
Publications established in 1992
Computer science journals
English-language journals